Guilherme Andrade da Silva, commonly known as Guilherme Andrade, (born 31 January 1989 in Montes Claros) is a Brazilian footballer who plays as a right back for Barretos.

Honours
Corinthians
FIFA Club World Cup: 2012
Campeonato Paulista: 2013
Recopa Sudamericana: 2013

Statistics 

FIFA Club World Cup

External links
 Corinthians contrata lateral Guilherme da Ponte Preta 
 

Living people
1989 births
Brazilian footballers
People from Montes Claros
Campeonato Brasileiro Série A players
Campeonato Brasileiro Série B players
Associação Atlética Ponte Preta players
São Paulo FC players
Sport Club Corinthians Paulista players
Ceará Sporting Club players
Clube Atlético Bragantino players
Clube Atlético Tubarão players
Esporte Clube Água Santa players
Barretos Esporte Clube players
Association football midfielders
Sportspeople from Minas Gerais